Le Lamentin 3rd Canton Est is a former canton in the Arrondissement of Fort-de-France on Martinique. It had 12,643 inhabitants (2012). It was disbanded in 2015. The canton comprised part of the commune of Le Lamentin.

References

Cantons of Martinique